The erg agama (Trapelus tournevillei), also commonly known as the Sahara agama,  is a species of lizard in the family Agamidae. The species is endemic to North Africa.

Etymology
The specific name, tournevillei, is in honor of French herpetologist Albert Tourneville.

Geographic range
T. tournevillei is found in Algeria and Tunisia.

Habitat
The natural habitat of T. tournevillei is hot deserts.

Reproduction
T. tournevillei is oviparous.

Conservation status
T. tournevillei is threatened by habitat loss.

References

Further reading
Barts M (2002). "Weitere Daten zur Lebensweise von Trapelus tournevillei (LATASTE, 1880) (Sauria: Agamidae)". Sauria 24 (2): 19–22. (in German).
Boulenger GA (1885). Catalogue of the Lizards in the British Museum (Natural History). Second Edition. Volume I. ... Agamidæ. London: Trustees of the British Museum (Natural History). (Taylor and Francis, printers). xii + 436 pp. + Plates I–XXXII. ("Agama tournevilii [sic]", pp. 340–341).
Boulenger GA (1919). "Sur l' Agama tournevillei Lataste, du Sahara algérien". Bulletin de la Société Zoologique de France 44: 111–115. (in French).
Lataste F (1880). "Diagnoses de reptiles nouveaux d'Algérie". Le Naturaliste 2 (41): 325. (Agama tournevillei, new species). (in French).
Schleich HH, Kästle W, Kabisch K (1996). Amphibians and Reptiles of North Africa. Koenigstein, Germany: Koeltz Scientific Books. 630 pp. . (Trapelus tournevillei, new combination, p. 295).

Trapelus
Reptiles described in 1880
Taxa named by Fernand Lataste
Taxonomy articles created by Polbot